Keys to the Highway is the sixth studio album by American country music artist Rodney Crowell,  released in 1989 by Columbia Records (see 1989 in country music). It peaked at number 15 on the Top Country Albums chart. The songs, "Many a Long & Lonesome Highway", "If Looks Could Kill", "My Past Is Present", "Now That We're Alone" and "Things I Wish I'd Said" were released as singles. The last single failed to reach the top 40.

Track listing
All songs written By Rodney Crowell except when noted
"My Past Is Present" (Crowell, Steuart Smith) - 2:49
"If Looks Could Kill" - 3:25
"Soul Searchin'" - 3:57
"Many a Long & Lonesome Highway" (Crowell, Will Jennings) - 4:16
"We Gotta Go on Meeting Like This" (Crowell, Larry Willoughby) - 2:54
"Faith Is Mine" - 4:29
"Tell Me the Truth" (Crowell, Jim Hanson, Vince Santoro, Smith) - 3:35
"Don't Let Your Feet Slow You Down" - 3:18
"Now That We're Alone" - 4:14
"Things I Wish I'd Said" - 4:08
"I Guess We've Been Together for Too Long" (Guy Clark, Crowell) - 2:46
"You Been on My Mind" - 3:28

Personnel

Musicians
The Dixie Pearls
 Eddie Bayers – drums
 Barry Beckett – piano, organ
 Rodney Crowell – lead vocals, acoustic guitar
 Hank DeVito – steel guitar, acoustic guitar
 Paul Franklin – steel guitar
 Jim Hanson – bass guitar, background vocals
 Michael Rhodes – bass guitar
 Vince Santoro – drums, background vocals
 Steuart Smith – electric guitar, acoustic guitar
Guest musicians
 Rosanne Cash – background vocals
 Ashley Cleveland – background vocals
 Vince Gill – background vocals
 Mark O'Connor – fiddle, mandolin
 Harry Stinson – background vocals

Technical
 Tony Brown – production
 Donivan Coward – overdubbing
 Rodney Crowell – production, arrangement
 The Dixie Pearls – arrangement
 John Guess – mixing
 Glen Hardin – orchestra arrangement, conduction
 Steve Marcantonio – engineering, mixing
 Glenn Meadows – mastering
 Steuart Smith – arrangement

Chart performance

Weekly charts

Year-end charts

Singles

Sources

1991 albums
Rodney Crowell albums
Columbia Records albums
Albums produced by Tony Brown (record producer)
Albums produced by Rodney Crowell